The phonology of Burmese is fairly typical of a Southeast Asian language, involving phonemic tone or register, a contrast between major and minor syllables, and strict limitations on consonant clusters.

Consonants 
Burmese has 34 consonant phonemes. Stops and affricates make a three-way contrast with voiced, voiceless, and voiceless aspirated.

Phonetic notes:
/sʰ/ is a complex phoneme to define. It is a reflex of the earlier /tʃʰ/ and then /tsʰ/ consonants. It is still distinguished from /s/ although it is not so much aspirated as pronounced breathy, and imparts a slight breathy quality to the following vowel making  a more accurate transcription.
 is rare, having disappeared from modern Burmese, except in transcriptions of foreign names and a handful of native words.

An additional rare  occurs, but this only appears in toponyms and personal names that have retained Sanskrit or Pali pronunciations (such as Amarapura, pronounced  and in English-derived words. ('king').

Medials and palatalisation

Burmese permits the palatalisation of certain consonants. Besides [u̯], which is often erroneously treated as a medial [w] (see vowels), Burmese only permits the palatal medial. This is derived from Old Burmese */-j-/ */-l-/ and */-ɹ-/, and is, therefore, reflected in various ways in different dialects. In MSB orthography, two spellings exist for the medial (demonstrated on the consonant  ), one reflecting an original /-j-/ ( - ), and one an original /-ɹ-/ ( - ). Official government romanisation still reflects this fact, as Myanmar, in official romanisation is rendered mran-ma.

Although the palatalisation of the labials is simple  → , and the velar nasal predictably palatalises into a palatal nasal  → . The velar stops  palatalise into .

The alveolars  and historical palatals  cannot be followed by medials except in loan words, but even this is rare. Indeed, the letter *jʰ  [z, sʰ] is almost indistinguishable from the s+y sequence  and many combinations of alveolar+medial will render poorly in certain font sets which were not designed to handle non-native combined graphs.

The homorganic nasal and glottal stop

Only two consonants can occur word finally in native vocabulary: the homorganic or placeless nasal, and the homorganic or glottal stop. These bear some similarities to the Japanese moraic n, ン and sokuon っ.

It has the effect of shortening the vowel and precluding it from bearing tone. This itself is often referred to as the "checked" or "entering" tone, following Chinese nomenclature. It can be realised as a geminate of a following stop, although this is purely allophonic and optional as the difference between the sequence /VʔtV/ and /VtːV/ is only in the catch, and thus barely audible. The primary indicator of this final is the impact on the vowel.

The final nasal is usually realised as nasalisation of the vowel. It may also allophonically appear as a homorganic nasal before stops.

Series of stops
Burmese orthography is based on Brahmic script and can perfectly transcribe words from Pali, an Indic language. As a result, Burmese script uses far more symbols than Burmese needs for its phonemic inventory. All stops come in sets of four: voiceless aspirated, voiceless, voiced, and voiced aspirated or murmured. They are frequently seen in loans from Pali. It may be possible to say that they exist only in loans; however, some of the words they appear in are so old and deeply integrated into the language that the three-way voicing/aspiration distinction can still be said to be an important part of the language. They are generally pronounced as voiced  or, when following a syllable final stop, aspirated . The most common by far is  used in the negative indicative verb particle ဘူး bhú [búː] or [pʰúː], and also in some common loans.

Burmese voicing sandhi

Burmese exhibits voicing sandhi. Traditionally, Burmese has voiced voiceless unaspirated stops into voiced stops, which at first, was allophonic. However, due to the influx of phonemic voiced stops from loan words, and owing to the extension of sandhi to voiceless aspirated stops as well – a feature which does not affect more conservative dialects – sandhi has become an important part of Burmese phonology and word building. In brief, the following shifts can occur in MSB:

Additionally  can become voiced under the same conditions, however this is purely allophonic since the voiced  phone does not exist in any other context.

Sandhi can occur in two environments. In the first environment, consonants become voiced between vowels or after nasals. This is similar to rendaku in Japanese. This therefore, can affect any consonant except the first consonant of the phrase or a consonant preceded by a stop.
e.g. "hot water":   ←  + 

The second environment occurs around reduced syllables (see reduction for more). When a syllable becomes reduced, the vowel and any final consonants are reduced to a short schwa . Reduction cannot occur in the final syllable of a word. When a syllable becomes reduced, if both the consonant preceding and following the schwa – i.e. the consonant of the reduced syllable and the consonant of the following syllable – are stops, then both will be voiced:
e.g. "promise":   ←  + 

In some compound works, the phoneme , when following the nasalized final , can shift to a  sound:
e.g. "blouse" ( angkyi):  → .

The phonemes , when following the nasalized final , can become  in compound words:
e.g. "to consult" :  → 
e.g. "to apologize" :  → 
e.g. "airplane" :  →

Aspiration and devoicing

Although Burmese natively contrasts unaspirated and aspirated stops, there is an additional devoicing/aspirating feature. In OB, h- or a syllable beginning with /h/ could be prefixed to roots, merging over time with the consonant of the following syllable. In the case of the unaspirated stops, these are replaced with the aspirated letter, however words beginning with                 use a subscript diacritic called ha-to to indicate devoicing:  , although as noted above,  is incredibly rare. Devoicing in Burmese is not strong, particularly not on nasals.

In many Burmese verbs, pre-aspiration and post-aspiration distinguishes the causative and non-causative forms of verbs, where the aspirated initial consonant indicates active voice or a transitive verb, while an unaspirated initial consonant indicates passive voice or an intransitive verb:
e.g. "to cook" ,  vs. "to be cooked" , 
e.g. "to loosen" ,  vs. "to be loosened" ,  
e.g. "to elevate" ,  vs. "to be elevated" ,

Vowels 
The vowels of Burmese are:

In addition to the above monophthongs, Burmese also has nasal and oral diphthongs:         . There is debate on the phonemicity of some of the above vowels.

Although this analysis is (more or less) correct from a purely phonetic point of view, it hides the diachronic nature of Burmese vowel development and mergers, and obfuscates the reasoning behind Burmese orthography.

Vowels in open syllables

Synchronically, there can be said to be a total of 10 vowels in Modern Standard Burmese (MSB) open syllables: /a/ /u̯a/ /ɛ/ /u̯ɛ/ /e/ /u̯e/ /i/ /ɔ/ /o/ /u/. Although the vowels /u̯a/ /u̯ɛ/ /u̯e/ are commonly treated as medial-vowel sequences, reducing the vowel inventory of MSB in open syllables from 10 to 7, the behaviour of /u̯a/ /u̯ɛ/ /u̯e/ is unlike that of glide-vowel combinations (See the section on glides below for a more complete explanation).

Diachronically, however, all of the MSB open syllable vowels are derived from Old Burmese (OB) open syllables or diphthongs. The four vowels of OB were */a/ */i/ */o/ */u/. Early in the development of Burmese */o/ broke to form */u̯a/. Additionally, any vowel could be followed by either of two glides: */j/ and */w/. The diphthongs which result from these glides were considered to be closed syllables in OB and as such, could not be followed by any other consonant. However, in MSB, all OB diphthongs have become monophthongs and are thus phonetically viewed as open syllables.

The following table shows the origins of MSB open vowels. The IPA is followed by the phoneme demonstrated in Burmese script on the consonant  /p/ showing (top to bottom) creaky tone, low tone, and high tone.

From the table it is clear that the vowels /ɛ/ /u̯ɛ/ /e/ /u̯e/ /ɔ/ /o/ can only exist in open syllables in MSB (with some rare exceptions) as they derive from vowel+glide combinations.

The /j/ offglide results in the e-class vowels */aj/→/ɛ/, */ij/→/e/, */u̯aj/→/u̯ɛ/, */uj/→/u̯e/ respectively. Note the symmetry with the base vowel system: The closed vowels */i/ and */u/ create the mid-closed vowels /e/ and /u̯e/ while */a/ and */o/ create the mid-open vowels /ɛ/ and /u̯ɛ/. Similarly, the rounded on-glide is a result of a rounded base vowel */u/ or */o/.

Currently, the /w/ offglide is only believed to have existed in */aw/ and */uw/ resulting in the MSB o-class vowels /ɔ/ and /o/ respectively. The absence of */iw/ and */ow/ in reconstructions is something of a mystery, however it is possible that, by analogy with the /j/ offglide, */aw/ */iw/ */ow/ */uw/ all existed, resulting in pairs with or without the rounded on-glide: /ɔ/ /o/ /u̯ɔ/ /u̯o/ which later merged. This may explain why the Burmese orthography indicates the vowel /o/ with both the diacritics for both the /i/ and /u/ vowels and, previously, a following consonantal /w/.

Finals

MSB recognises 8 finals in native vocabulary which are all distinguished from their initial forms with the c-shaped superscript diacritic asat  which for ease of reading, is omitted here: the stops: ပ /p/ တ /t/ စ /c/ က /k/ and the nasals: မ /m/ န /n/ ည / ဉ /ɲ/ င /ŋ/. All of the stops in final position are realised as a glottal stop /ʔ/ (or, potentially, a geminate of a following stop) which shortens the vowel and precludes it from bearing any tone. All of the nasals on the other hand nasalise the vowel but are not pronounced as consonants unless there is a following nasal or stop. Syllables ending on nasals can bear any of the three tones, but rarely have tone 1 (short, high, creaky phonation).

Finals are broadly grouped into two sets: front and back finals. Front finals include the labial and alveolar finals -m -n and -p -t which are not distinguished in MSB, leading to mergers such as အိပ် (*/ip/ sleep) and အိတ် (*/it/ bag), both pronounced [ĕɪʔ]. In Tavoyan dialects however, the labial finals -m and -p often cause vowel breaking (*/un/ -> /ũː/, */um/ -> /ãʊ/). The back finals include the palatal finals -c -ɲ and velar -k -ŋ, although their uses are even more complex.

Current reconstruction holds that the OB vowel-offglide sequences – which today are /ɛ/ /u̯ɛ/ /e/ /u̯e/ /ɔ/ /o/ in MSB – counted as a closed syllables and thus could not be followed by a final. As a result, most closed syllables in MSB are built around the 4 basic vowels /a/ /i/ /u̯a/ /u/.

Vowels before labial and coronal finals

The 4 basic vowels /a/ /i/ /u̯a/ /u/ can all occur before the labial and coronal finals. In MSB before the -p and -t finals they are pronounced /æʔ/ /eɪʔ/ /u̯æʔ~ʊʔ/ /ɔʊʔ/ respectively. Similarly, before the -m and -n finals, vowels use the same qualities except that they are nasalised and are pronounced long by default thus giving: /æ̃/ /ẽɪ/ /u̯æ̃~ʊ̃/ /ɔ̃ʊ/.

The variation between /ʊ̆ʔ/ /ʊ̃ː/ and /u̯æ̆ʔ/ /u̯æ̃ː/ is regional. North-central dialects in and around Mandalay tend to use the original opening diphthong while southern dialects in and around Yangon tend to use the monophthong. Both pronunciations are universally accepted and understood. In more conservative dialects /i/ /u/ and */o/ may not break, and thus remain /ĭʔ/ /ĩ/, /ŭʔ/ /ũ/, and /ɔ̆ʔ/ /ɔ̃/, additionally */an/ may move back, not forward, leaving /ɔ̃/ and not /æ̃/, but all of these features are considered non-standard.

Some exceptions do exist to this rule, however, as even in Yangon Burmese the word စွမ်း (*suám "power") is pronounced /su̯áːN/ while ဆွမ်း (*sʰuám "religious offering of food"), written with the same rime and tone, is pronounced /s(ʰ)ʊ́ːN/.

In Tavoyan dialects, labial finals are often distinguished from coronal finals by breaking and rounding vowels.

Vowels before dorsal finals

The velar finals  -k and  -ŋ can follow the vowels /a/ and /u̯a/ giving အက် /ɐʔ/ အွက် /u̯æʔ/ အင် /ɪ̃/ အွင် /u̯ɪ̃/. The pronunciation of -ak is becoming /æʔ/ in Yangon Burmese, merging with -ap and -at. Older speakers will pronounce the vowel higher and as a front-central vowel in the [ɛ~ɜ] range. The fronting of *a before *ŋ to /ɪ/ is a distinctive feature of MSB, not shared by other varieties of Burmese. Rakhine/Arakhanese dialects shift the /a/ back before both the stop and nasal to become /ɔ̆ʔ/ /ɔ̃ː/. Tavoyan/Dawei dialects merge both the -ap -at -ak rimes (as is becoming common in Yangon) and also merge the  -am -an -aŋ rimes allegedly resulting in /ăʔ/ /ãː/, although it is unclear whether these are truly [a] or [æ] as in MSB..

The palatal finals  and  occur only with the inherent vowel /a/ and derive from OB *ik and *iŋ. The spelling reflects the shifts of *ik > *ac and *iŋ > aɲ. The final  today is /ɪʔ/. The palatal final, however, has two forms. The form  represents /ĩ/ (or /ãɪ/ in Rakhine dialects) as would be expected. The far more common  however has lost its nasal characteristic and is realised variously as /ɛ/ (မည် /mɛ̀/ literary future/irrealis marker, written မယ် in colloquial language), /i/ (ပြည် /pʲì/ "country" pronounced as ပြီ "end, finish"), and less often /e/ (ရည် /jè/ "juice", pronounced identically to ရေ "water"). Tavoyan dialects restrict the pronunciation to /ɛ/ exclusively, while Rakhine dialects use /e/.

The rimes */aʊk/ (အောက်) */aʊŋ/ (အောင်) derive from OB *uk and *uŋ breaking to /aʊ/ before a velar final. The change in spelling reflects this sound shift and should not be taken to indicate an OB *awk *awŋ or *ɔk *ɔŋ sequence. In Tavoyan they are realised as /ɔ̆ʔ/ and /ɔ̃ː/ respectively.

The rimes (အိုက်) and (အိုင်) are somewhat problematic from a linguistic perspective. Written with the compound vowel diacritic for /o/ and pronounced /ăɪʔ/ and /ãɪ/ respectively, they are currently believed to represent either loans from foreign languages or from more conservative dialects of Burmese. They do not fit into the normal table of rimes and their shared orthography with the /o/ vowel is coincidental.

The closed syllable vowel inventory

Just as open syllables have ten vowels, so too do closed syllables: /æ/ /ɪ/ /ɛ~ɜ/ /u̯æ~ʊ/ /u̯ɛ/ /u̯ɪ/ /eɪ/ /oʊ/ /aɪ/ /aʊ/. It is worth noting that in Yangon MSB no vowel quality exists in both closed and open syllables, and that therefore nasalisation and the glottal stop cannot be said to be contrastive features in and of themselves. In fact, with the exception of tone (and its inherent length, intensity, and phonation) no suprasegmental features can really be said to be phonemic.

Finals in loans

Following the breaking of *u to /aʊ/ before velars and the palatalisation of velars after *i, new vocabulary entered the language with sequences of /i/ or /u/ followed by a velar. Thus, လိင် /lèɪN/ "sex" is pronounced as လိမ် "to twist, cheat" and သုက် (semen) is pronounced exactly as သုပ် (salad) /ɾ̪ɔʊʔ/ (or /θɔʊʔ/ following conventional transcription).

In loan words, usually from Pali, လ /l/ ရ /ɹ~j/ ဝ /w/ သ /s/ are found but are silent and do not affect the vowel, which continues to behave as an open syllable vowel. Also from Pali are the retroflex finals ဋ /ʈ/ and ဏ /ɳ/ which merge with their alveolar counterparts.

The superscript diacritic  anusvara is a convention inherited from Pali. It is used across Brahmic scripts in homorganic nasal+plosive sequences as a shorthand for the nasal (which would otherwise have to carry an asat or form a ligature with the following stop). In Burmese it continues this function as it is found not only in loaned vocabulary but also in native words e.g. သုံး /ɾ̪óʊːN/ (or /θóʊːN/) "three" or "to use" which derives from proto-Sino-Tibetan *g-sum.

The consonant  is also seen with an asat diacritic, but this is the standard spelling for the vowel /ɛ/ with tone 2 and is not viewed in any way as a final (although, as noted above, this is an etymologically accurate rendering of /ɛ/ which originated from the *ay sequence).

Finally, loaned vocabulary can also, uniquely, add a final after the vowel /e/. An example of this is the common Pali word မေတ္တာ mettā, from Sanskrit  मैत्र maitra. This is exclusively used to transcribe an /e/ vowel in closed syllables in loans, but cannot occur in native vocabulary, although many such loans, particularly from Pali, may be centuries old.

Notes on glides

Note that, the vocalic onglide /u̯/ is usually transcribed both in phonetic transcription and in romanisation as /w/. This is due to the fact that, phonetically, it behaves as a medial, however, here the transcription /u̯/ is used to emphasise that it is a part of the vowel and not a true medial like /-j-/ (romanised -y-). /-j-/ is derived from OB */-j-/ */-l-/ and */-ɹ-/, and is, therefore, reflected in various ways in different dialects. In MSB orthography two spellings exist for the medial (demonstrated on the consonant က /k/), one reflecting an original /-j-/ (ကျ - ky), and one an original /-ɹ-/ (ကြ - kr) and official government romanisation still reflects this fact (Myanmar, in official romanisation is rendered mran-ma). However, in MSB, */ɹ/, for which there is also a unique initial letter , is pronounced /j/ in all instances (usually realised as [ʝ] initially) except in loan words.
The letter for /l/  is still pronounced as /l/ in initial position, but as a medial, it has completely merged with /-j-/ and /-ɹ-/.
These medials behave differently than the /u̯/ onglide in the following ways:

 a medial */-j-/ */-l-/ */-ɹ-/ can be placed before the on-glide /u̯/, whereas two medials can never be used in the same syllable.
 the use of /u̯/ is restricted by the vowel nucleus (only used with /a/ /ɛ/ /e/) and may in some cases drastically change the pronunciation of the vowel e.g. in Yangon /wa/ before a final becomes [ʊ], while /a/ before a final becomes [æ]. However, it cannot affect the pronunciation of the initial.
 glides are restricted by the preceding initial, and often change its pronunciation. Bearing in mind that MSB does not reliably indicate the development of */-l-/, /m/ /pʰ/ /p/ /b/ can apparently be followed by any glide, in which case the glide becomes [ʲ]. Similarly /kʰ/ /k/ and /g/ can be followed by any glide, in which case the cluster becomes [tʃʰ] [tʃ] or [dʒ] respectively. /ŋ/ can be followed by /-ɹ-/ but not /-j-/ in which case the cluster becomes [ɲ], merging with the palatal nasal letter . And finally, /l/ can be followed by /-j-/ but not /-ɹ-/. This is rare and in Yangon MSB this represents the only case where the medial impacts the vowel, whereby the sequence လျာ */ljaː/ is realised [lea̯] and လျင် becomes *lyaŋ > lyiŋ becomes [lɪə̃]. Although there is a lot of variation in the pronunciation of these syllables. Tavoyan front vowels are frequently raised following /-j-/.
There is, at least in Yangon MSB, no difference between an initial /j/ /ɹ/ /w/ and a null initial with /-j-/ /-ɹ-/ /u̯/. This extends to a /w/ initial followed by a  /u̯/ onglide. Therefore, in Yangon (and likely much of MSB) /wa/, /Øu̯a/, and /wu̯a/ are pronounced identically.

Tones 
Burmese is a tonal language, which means phonemic contrasts can be made on the basis of the tone of a vowel. In Burmese, these contrasts involve not only pitch, but also phonation, intensity (loudness), duration, and vowel quality. However, some linguists consider Burmese a pitch-register language like Shanghainese.

Like most East and South-East Asian languages (Notably Chinese), the Burmese tone system developed in the following way:

Syllables ending on a stop (-p, -t, -k) developed a unique tone, called checked or entering tone following Chinese nomenclature (入 rù). Other syllables (i.e. those ending on a nasal, a glide, or no final) are believed to have been able to end on an additional glottal stop  and/or be glottalised  or alternatively they could end on a fricative, likely either /s/ or /h/. The loss of these final glottal and fricative created the Burmese creaky and high tones respectively. Low tone is the result of syllables which had neither a glottal nor fricative ending.

In this way, The Burmese creaky, low, and high tones correspond to the Middle Chinese rising (上 shǎng), level (平 píng), and departing (去 qù) tones respectively, as well as the Vietnamese tone pairs of sắc & nặng, ngang & huyền, and hỏi & ngã respectively.

Creaky tone and high tone both have distinctive phonations—creaky and breathy respectively. They are also notably shorter and longer than low tone respectively.

In the following table, the four tones are shown marked on the vowel  as an example.

For example, the following words are distinguished from each other only on the basis of tone:
 Low ခါ  "shake"
 High ခါး  "be bitter"
 Creaky ခ  "to strike"
 Checked ခတ်  "to beat"

 Low ခံ  "undergo"
 High ခန်း  "dry up"
 Creaky ခန့်  "appoint"

As with many East and South-East Asian languages, the phonation of the initial consonant can trigger a tone split - which explains why pairs of tones in Vietnamese correspond with single Burmese tones, and why languages like Thai, Lao, and Cantonese have significantly more than 4 tones. Although this feature has been historically absent from Burmese, a tone split is underway currently. Sonorants with a ha-to (devoicing mark - see section on consonants) raise the tone of the following vowel. Customarily, this distinction is transcribed with the letter h in romanisation and is explicitly marked on the consonant in Burmese script e.g. မ (ma "woman") vs မှ (hma "from"). In earlier times this distinction was borne primarily on the consonant in the form of devoicing/murmuring, then later imparted a breathy quality to the vowel itself. More recently this has translated into a general tone raising, even in checked syllables (i.e. those ending on a stop -p -t -k) representing the first time tonal distinctions have occurred in such syllables e.g. မြောက် (*mruk /mʲaʊʔ/ "north") vs မြှောက် (*hmruk /m̤ʲá̤ʊʔ/ "to raise"). Consequently, Burmese can be described as having 8 tones. Note that this does not apply to devoiced r ရှ, y ယှ, or ly လျှ as this results in [ʃ] with no breathy phonation. In some dialects, for instance those around Inle Lake, devoiced l လှ results in a voiceless lateral fricative /ɬ/, making tone raising unlikely.

Reduced syllables have the rime [ə̀], which is short and low. This is not considered to be a distinct tone, but rather the absence of distinct tone or rime all together.

In spoken Burmese, some linguists classify two real tones (there are four nominal tones transcribed in written Burmese), "high" (applied to words that terminate with a stop or check, high-rising pitch) and "ordinary" (unchecked and non-glottal words, with falling or lower pitch), with those tones encompassing a variety of pitches. The "ordinary" tone consists of a range of pitches. Linguist L. F. Taylor concluded that "conversational rhythm and euphonic intonation possess importance" not found in related tonal languages and that "its tonal system is now in an advanced state of decay."

Syllable structure 
The syllable structure of Burmese is C(G)V((V)C), which is to say the onset consists of a consonant optionally followed by a glide, and the rime consists of a monophthong alone, a monophthong with a consonant, or a diphthong with a consonant. Some representative words are:
 CV မယ်  'girl'
 CVC မက်  'crave'
 CGV မြေ  'earth'
 CGVC မျက်  'eye'
 CVVC မောင်  (term of address for young men)
 CGVVC မြောင်း  'ditch'

A minor syllable has some restrictions:
 It contains  as its only vowel
 It must be an open syllable (no coda consonant)
 It cannot bear tone
 It has only a simple (C) onset (no glide after the consonant)
 It must not be the final syllable of the word

Some examples of words containing minor syllables:
 ခလုတ်  'knob'
 ပလွေ  'flute'
 သရော်  'mock'
 ကလက်  'be wanton'
 ထမင်းရည်  'rice-water'

Notes

References

Bibliography 

 
 
 
 
 
 
 
 
 
 

Phonology
Sino-Tibetan phonologies